Johannes Brandenberg (1660 –1729) was a Swiss painter.

Life
Brandenberg was born at Zug, in Switzerland, in 1660. He was the son of Thomas Brandenberg, a painter little known, by whom he was instructed in the art. On the death of his father he was 
taken under the protection of the Count of Ferrara, who took him to Mantua, where he was so struck with the works of Giulio Romano that he applied himself with great diligence to studying and 
copying them.

On his return to his native country he gave convincing proof of the advantage his travels and study had been to him in several pictures he painted for the churches and convents of the different towns in Switzerland. He painted some pastoral subjects in fresco on the ceiling of the concert-room at Zurich. His historical pictures are well composed, correctly drawn, and vigorously coloured. He also painted some battle-pieces, which were much admired.

He died in 1729.

Notes

References

Sources
 

17th-century Swiss painters
Swiss male painters
18th-century Swiss painters
18th-century Swiss male artists
1660 births
1729 deaths
People from the canton of Zug
People from Zug